The men's triple jump event at the 1973 Summer Universiade was held at the Central Lenin Stadium in Moscow on 18 and 19 August.

Medalists

Results

Qualification
Qualification distance: 15.70 m

Final

References

Athletics at the 1973 Summer Universiade
1973